Mangesh Satamkar is an Indian politician and Shiv Sena leader from Mumbai, Maharashtra. 
He is  the Education Committee Chairman in Brihanmumbai Municipal Corporation. He had worked on several committees in the municipal corporation such as Standing committee, Education Committee etc. He had unsuccessfully contested Sion Koliwada Assembly election in 2014.

Positions held
 1994: Elected as corporator in Brihanmumbai Municipal Corporation
 2002: Re-elected as corporator in Brihanmumbai Municipal Corporation
 2004, 2006, 2007: Education Committee Chairman Brihanmumbai Municipal Corporation 
 2007: Re-elected as corporator in Brihanmumbai Municipal Corporation
 2017: Re-elected as corporator in Brihanmumbai Municipal Corporation
 2018: Elected as Education Committee Chairman Brihanmumbai Municipal Corporation

References

External links
 Shiv Sena official website

Living people
21st-century Indian politicians
Shiv Sena politicians
Marathi politicians
Year of birth missing (living people)